John Rayborn (born August 21, 1975) is a former American football quarterback who played three seasons in the Arena Football League with the Indiana Firebirds, Detroit Fury, Columbus Destroyers and New Orleans VooDoo. He played college football at the University of Texas at El Paso. He was also member of the Saskatchewan Roughriders of the Canadian Football League. He was named First Team All-af2 in 2002 while a member of the Macon Knights.

References

External links
UTEP Miners bio
Just Sports Stats
College stats

Living people
1975 births
Players of American football from Texas
American football quarterbacks
Canadian football quarterbacks
American players of Canadian football
UTEP Miners football players
Saskatchewan Roughriders players
Indiana Firebirds players
Macon Knights players
Detroit Fury players
Columbus Destroyers players
New Orleans VooDoo players
Sportspeople from Arlington, Texas